Dyson Airblade is an electric hand dryer made by the Singapore-based company Dyson, found in public bathrooms across the United Kingdom. It was introduced in the United Kingdom in 2006 and in the United States in late 2007. In 2013 the Airblade Tap was launched, which incorporates Airblade technology into a bathroom faucet enabling washing and drying in a single unit.

Description 
The Dyson Airblade is claimed by its manufacturer to dry hands in 10 seconds and to use less electricity than conventional hand dryers.

The first commercially available high-speed, horizontal-wiping air dryer was the Mitsubishi Jet Towel, developed since 1991 and introduced in 1993. It is available in the United States since 2005. There are several technical differences among electric hand dryers, such as airspeed, water containment, energy efficiency, use of heat, type of filter, motor lifespan, power usage and spreading of germs.

The same technology is used by Dyson in the Air Multiplier fan to create a cooling air stream for personal comfort.

Energy efficiency
The Dyson Airblade is 69% more energy-efficient than conventional hand-dryers and 97% more cost effective than paper towels. The Airblade is cheaper to operate because it does not require hot air which greatly increases electricity consumption. The Airblade is also cheaper to operate due to decreased drying times. The Airblade V can dry off hands in 12 seconds, versus 25 for a traditional hand dryer.

Drying time
A comparative test found that both paper towels and the Airblade dried hands quickly, achieving around 90% dryness in about ten seconds, supporting Dyson's claim of approximately ten seconds of drying time. A conventional warm air dryer took about forty-seven seconds.

Hygiene

In the United States, Dyson worked with the NSF to become the only certified hand dryer under Protocol P335 for Hygienic Commercial Hand Dryers. The Royal Society of Public Health has given the Dyson Airblade hand dryer its first hygiene accreditation.

A paper was presented at the 17th European Congress of Clinical Microbiology and Infectious Diseases, Munich, Germany in 2007 by the University of Bradford and Dyson showing that for a set drying time of 10 seconds, the Airblade led to significantly less bacterial transfer than with the other driers (p < 0.05). When the latter were used for longer (30–35 s) the trend was for the Airblade to still perform better; however, these results did not reach statistical significance (p > 0.05). In addition the study showed that rubbing hands whilst using the driers counteracted the reduction in overall bacterial numbers at all anatomical sites.

Hygiene associated with the product has been questioned in research by the University of Westminster Trade Group, London and sponsored by the paper towel industry the European Tissue Symposium, which suggests that use increases the amount of bacteria on the fingertips by about 42%; paper towels reduced the number of bacteria by 50 to 75%, while warm air dryers increased bacteria by 194%. The report found that "the  manufacturer’s  claim  that  the  tested  JAD [Airblade] is 'the most hygienic hand  dryer'  is  confirmed ... assuming that the term 'hand dryer' refers to electric devices only because its performance in terms of the numbers of all types of bacteria remaining on the hands of users compared to paper towels was significantly worse."

Model history

In early 2013, three new models of the Dyson Airblade were introduced: the Airblade Mk. 2, the Airblade V, and the Airblade Tap. The Airblade V is a hands-under hand dryer that complies with the Americans With Disabilities Act.

The Airblade Tap is a non-contact bathroom tap that both washes and dries hands. It eliminates the need to move to a separate area to dry hands, and therefore eliminates any water dripped on the floor. All three hand dryers use a new Digital Slim Motor, the Dyson V4.

Controversies
 
On 5 December 2012, a lawsuit by competitor Excel Dryer was filed against Dyson, claiming that Dyson's advertising comparing the Airblade to the Excel Dryer Xlerator were deceptive.  Dyson's advertisements stated the Xlerator produces twice as much carbon dioxide, is worse for the environment, and costs more to operate than the Airblade.  Excel Dryer charged that Dyson was falsifying its comparisons by submitting a 20-second dry time for the Xlerator to the Materials Systems Laboratory at the Massachusetts Institute of Technology, rather than Excel Dryer's tested 12-second dry time, thus inflating energy consumption figures in the Airblade's favor.

In 2014, a paper was published in the Journal of Hospital Infection (2014;88:199-206), showing that high-speed hand dryers such as the Dyson Airblade can spread large numbers of a harmless test bacteria through the air in the vicinity. The Dyson company challenged the study with its own criticism of the methods and conclusions.

References

External links

 
 Video illustrating the circular flow of air of a Dyson Airblade.

Airblade
Hygiene